Anton Eichleiter (Augsburg, 1 March 1831 – Rorschach, 31 May 1902) was a German iron manufacturer, manager of the Ganz Works.

Life

Early years
Eichleiter was born to a family originated in Augsburg. His parents were Andreas Eichleiter, teacher in the Lutheran Gymnasium bei St. Anna, and Caroline Steinhard, daughter of a Lutheran priest. Eichleiter had eight siblings of whom three died in an early age and after his mother's death his father had to take care of them. After the primary school he went to an industrial and agricultural vocational school in Augsburg. Then he studied at the Polytechnikum (today the Augsburg University of Applied Sciences).

Budapest, Hungary
After finishing his studies he worked first as a locksmith then as a technical drawer in Erfurt, Thuringia at the main workshop of the Thüringer Bahn. In 1854 he was employed by the Cramer-Klett (predecessor of MAN SE) where he was commissioned to hand over the produced wagons to the 'Tisza Railway' (Tiszai Vasút) company in Szolnok, Austria-Hungary. The wheels of these wagons were delivered by the Ganz Works based in Buda, Austria-Hungary. He met the Swiss-born Hungarian industrialist Ábrahám Ganz (father of the Ganz Works) there who offered him a job in his foundry. His first project was to create a new, bigger workshop. He designed the one-piece chill cast peak inserts to the railway crossings. Beside his planner job he managed the correspondence with different railway companies.

One day his long time friend, András Mechwart visited him in Buda. Ábrahám Ganz offered Mechwart as well a job in his factory which he accepted. Mechwart was also a brother-in-law of Eichleiter, because Eichleiter's sister, Luise was the wife of Mechwart.

Before his death Ganz concluded with Eichleiter, Ulrich Keller and Mechwart a secret, final agreement that stated, in the case of his unexpected death Eichleiter has to become the head of the company, Eichleiter gets 22% of the shares, Keller gets 10% and Mechwart 8% and his heirs living in Switzerland get the majority (the other 60%) of the shares and they cannot sell the company to outsiders for ten years. So after Ganz's tragical death in 1867 Eichleiter, Mechwart and Keller became the manager of the Ganz Works. They changed the name of the company to 'Ganz & Co.'(Ganz és Társa). But after two years the heirs of Ganz sold the company to Eichleiter, Keller and Mechwart. They changed the name again in 1869, this time to 'Ganz & Co. Foundry & Machine Factory Inc.'(Ganz és Társa Vasöntő és Gépgyár Rt.) 

In 1873 because of the crisis Eichleiter and Keller left the company and sold there shares. Mechwart became the head of the Ganz Works.

Eichleiter was a board member of the 'Pest-Buda Beauty Committee' (Pest-Buda Szépészeti Bizottság) which served as an architectural judging association. The members were nominated by the Hungarian government. He was also a member of the economic council of the Budapest-based 'First Hungarian Wagon Factory Inc.'(Első Magyar Vasútikocsigyár Rt.), a technical advisor in a cornstarch-producing company and in the Salgótarján, Austria-Hungary based 'Salgótarján Coal Mine Ltd.' (Salgótarjáni Szénbányamű). Eichleiter was also an inspector and board member of the 'Commercial Bank of Buda' (Budai Kereskedelmi Bank). Later he became member of the exhibition committee of the World's Fair in Vienna in 1873, then correspondent and juror at the metal and machine department of the exhibition.

He was awarded the Order of Franz Joseph by the Austro-Hungarian emperor, Franz Joseph for his efforts in the industry development on the World's Fair in Vienna in 1873. He was also honored by the Turkish sultan Abdulaziz with the 'Medjedich Orden'.

Switzerland
All these rolles and workes tuckered him and made him ill, so he went to Thusis, Switzerland to relax. At that time he suffered in acute gastritis and depression. So he decided to change his way of life and move to Rorschach am Bodensee, Canton of St. Gallen, Switzerland where he bought the 'Weinhalde Villa'.

In 1871/72 he co-financed the establishment of a new girls' school in the Canton of St. Gallen. He financed, designed and built for the public two school buildings as well. He supported a lot of charity project in Rorschach: theatre, gymnastics association, well drilling for the public etc.

In 1879 he became school counselor, then the head of the school council, then Swiss citizen and honorary citizen of Rorschach.

In 1887 the Swiss parliament wanted to pass a new federal patent law. But in the last three decades the people repeatedly rejected it at the refenda. However, in other developed countries that kind of law already existed at that time and therefore the Swiss intellectual treasure was easier to get stolen. So the federal president of the republic, Numa Droz took the matter in his hand. He encouraged the communities to establish local pantent committees. Eichleichter became the president of the Canton of St. Gallen's committee, then member of the federal committee in Bern which looked after every single patent cases of Switzerland. And he also helped in the wording of the new federal patent law and lobbied for that. The new law passed by the parliament and people also voted for that, so it came into force in the same year.

After all their children left family nest, Eichleiter sold his house and moved to Munich, Bavaria. But he died on 31 May 1902 in Canton of St. Gallen.

Personal life
On 9 June 1956 he married Doris Wundsch, daughter of a Lutheran priest of Erfurt. Their first child, Friederike was born on 24 June 1857. Then came Hermann and Emil who both died in a young age. Then in 1864 Anna was born, then Julius (28 May 1866), Bernhard (21 December 1867) and Fritz (28 Januar 1869) came later. Anna, Emil and Friederike suffered in meningitis basilaris.

Luise Eichleiter, Antal's sister was the wife of András Mechwart.

Friederike Eichleiter, Antal's sister was the wife Julius Gulden. Gulden was an old friend of Eichleiter. Eichleiter asked Ganz to hire Gulden as a mechanical engineer in the Ganz Works like Mechwart. His professional field was the turbine construction.

References
 Terplán, Zénó (translated from the original German biography of Antal Eichleiter): Ki vezette a gyárat Ganz Ábrahám (1814-1867) halála után? (Who lead the factory after the death of Ábrahám Ganz?)

Notes

External links

1831 births
1902 deaths
19th-century German businesspeople
19th-century German engineers
19th-century Swiss businesspeople
19th-century Lutherans
Businesspeople from Augsburg
German Lutherans
Augsburg University of Applied Sciences alumni